KNVM (89.7 FM) is a radio station broadcasting Spanish Christian radio format Radio Nueva Vida. Licensed to Prunedale, California, United States, the station is owned by The Association For Community Education, Inc.

Swap to Educational Media Foundation
Prunedale Educational Association announced it would be swapping the then-KLVM and its five translators to Educational Media Foundation for KARW Salinas. The transaction was consummated on December 19, 2017. EMF changed the station's call sign to KNVM on January 22, 2018. In 2019 it brought by Radio Nueva Vida.

References

External links

Radio stations established in 1986
1986 establishments in California
Educational Media Foundation radio stations
NVM